Complete results for Men's Slalom competition at the 2011 World Championships, run on Sunday, February 20. The 11th race of the championships, its first run was at 10:00 local time (CET) and the second run at 13:30.
A total of 100 athletes from 55 countries competed in the final.

Results

References

Slalom, men's